George Edward Lees (February 2, 1895 – January 2, 1980) was a Major League Baseball catcher who played for the Chicago White Sox in .

External links

1895 births
1980 deaths
Chicago White Sox players
Baseball players from Pennsylvania
Major League Baseball catchers
Sportspeople from Bethlehem, Pennsylvania
Nashville Vols players